The 2016–17 CEV Women's Challenge Cup was the 37th edition of the European Challenge Cup volleyball club tournament, the former "CEV Cup".

Format
The tournament was played on a knockout format, with 32 teams participating. On 30 June 2016, a drawing of lots in Varna, Bulgaria, determined the team's pairing for each match. Each team plays a home and an away match with result points awarded for each leg (3 points for 3–0 or 3–1 wins, 2 points for 3–2 win, 1 point for 2–3 loss). After two legs, the team with the most result points advances to the next round. The Golden Set winner is the team that first obtains 15 points, provided that the points difference between the two teams is at least 2 points (thus, the Golden Set is similar to a tiebreak set in a normal match).

Participating teams
Drawing of lots for the 32 participating team was held in Varna, Bulgaria on 30 June 2016.

Main phase

16th Final
1st leg (Team #1 home) 14–15 December 2016
2nd leg (Team #2 home) 10–12 January 2017

*Notes:
 Match# 2 – The second leg was played on 17 January 2017.
 Match# 9 – The order of the fixtures was reversed, the second leg was played in France on 14 December 2016 and the first leg in Belgium on 12 January 2017. The table keeps the order (team 1 and 2) as per draw result. 
 Match# 16 – Due to lack of financial resources to travel to Russia, Pannaxiakos withdrew from the competition on 5 December 2016. The CEV awarded both legs to Yenisei Krasnoyarsk.

8th Final
1st leg (Team #1 home) 24–25 January 2017
2nd leg (Team #2 home) 7–9 February 2017

4th Final
1st leg (Team #1 home) 22–23 February 2017 
2nd leg (Team #2 home) 7–9 March 2017

Final phase

Semifinals
1st leg (Team #1 home) 29 March 2017
2nd leg (Team #2 home) 2 April 2017

Finals
1st leg (Team #1 home) 12 April 2017
2nd leg (Team #2 home) 15 April 2017

Awards

References

External links
 Challenge Cup 16-17

CEV Women's Challenge Cup
CEV Women's Challenge Cup
CEV Women's Challenge Cup